Yangon United Sports Complex is a multi-use stadium in Yangon, Burma.  It is currently used mostly for football matches and is the home ground of Yangon United of the Myanmar National League.  The stadium has a capacity of 3,500 spectators.

External links
 Stadium information

Football venues in Myanmar
Sport in Yangon